The Sand Fork is a tributary of the Little Kanawha River,  long, in central West Virginia in the United States.

According to the West Virginia Department of Environmental Protection, approximately 92.8% of the Sand Fork watershed is forested, mostly deciduous.  Approximately 6% is used for pasture and agriculture.

The creek was named for the sand bars its contains.

See also
List of rivers of West Virginia

References 

Rivers of West Virginia
Little Kanawha River
Rivers of Gilmer County, West Virginia
Rivers of Lewis County, West Virginia